The Mission is the sixteenth studio album by American rock band Styx, released on June 16, 2017, through UMe. It is the band's first studio album since 2005's Big Bang Theory and their first release of original material since 2003's Cyclorama. The album reached #45 on the Billboard 200, propelled by pre-sales prior to its official release date, but fell off the chart after 2 weeks.  In an era with limited album sales, total U.S. Sales were approximately 15,000 copies, a far cry from the band's triple platinum past. Yet, the album did briefly reach the Top 100 in four other countries. The concept album tells the story of a mission to the planet Mars in the year 2033.  The album's story was written by Tommy Shaw and Will Evankovich. Evankovich played a significant role, serving as producer and co-writing all but one of the full length tracks.

The album was conceived in 2015 when Tommy Shaw composed the guitar riff that became the record's closing track, "Mission to Mars." The first lines Shaw wrote were "Now we can say it / This is the day / We'll be on our way / On our mission to Mars." The story was then formed around this idea.

Styx announced the album in conjunction with the release of the lead single "Gone Gone Gone," while "Radio Silence" and "Hundred Million Miles from Home" were later made available prior to the album's release.  The LP was expanded in 2018 and re-released in 5.1 surround sound (both DTS Master Audio and Dolby TrueHD) on a blu-ray disc with visualizations for each song as well as a various music videos from the album and a "Making of the Mission" documentary.

Reception 
The album was well received by AllMusic's Stephen Erlewine, awarding the release four out of five stars and considered it a return to form for the band. In his qualitative review, he emphasised the strength of the material harkening back to the band's late 70s material and Paradise Theatre album, despite not having Dennis DeYoung as the band's frontman.

Track listing

Personnel
Styx
Lawrence Gowanvocals, piano, Hammond B3 organ, synthesizers
Tommy Shawvocals, acoustic & electric guitars, mandolin
James "JY" Youngvocals, electric guitars
Ricky Phillipsbass guitar
Chuck Panozzobass guitar on "Hundred Million Miles from Home"
Todd Suchermandrums, percussion, waterphone

Additional personnel
Will Evankovichadditional synthesizers, guitars, sound effects, production, engineering

Production
Alan Hertzengineering
Sean Badumengineering
JR Tayloradditional engineering
Jim Scottmixing
Kevin Deanassistant mixing engineer
Derek Sharpadditional editing
Richard Duddmastering
Todd Gallopocover illustration, art direction & design
Jason Powellband photography

Charts

References

External links 
 Styx - The Mission (2017) album review by Stephen Thomas Erlewine, credits & releases at AllMusic.com
 Styx - The Mission (2017) album releases & credits at Discogs.com
 Styx - The Mission (2017) album to be listened as stream at Spotify.com

2017 albums
Styx (band) albums
Science fiction concept albums
Universal Music Enterprises albums
Mars in culture
Fiction set in 2033